The gens Barbatia was a Roman family during the first century BC.  It may have originated with Marcus Barbatius Philippus, a runaway slave who became a friend of Caesar, and subsequently obtained the praetorship under Marcus Antonius.  In 40 BC, he was quaestor propraetore under Antonius.

See also
List of Roman gentes

References

Roman gentes